Krbavica is a village in Croatia, located in Lika near Korenica. The population is 62 (2001 census). Pribići is a section of Krbavica. The village is eponymous to the nearby Krbavsko Polje.

References

Populated places in Lika-Senj County